Boca Raton Community High School is a magnet high school that is part of the School District of Palm Beach County, Florida, United States. It has been rated an "A" school each consecutive year by the Florida Department of Education since 2005 and was ranked 62nd on the list of America's Best High Schools by Newsweek in 2010.

Campus 

In 2002, the school was almost entirely demolished, and then reconstructed as a new, fully functional, state-of-the-art campus. There is a brand new science building.

In August 2007, the building of a new stadium began, and it was finished by July 2008. According to the South Florida Sun-Sentinel, the stadium features FieldTurf, a type of artificial turf with a thin, blade-like carpet that will allow use no matter what the weather. The new turf is also twice as soft as the previous field, so falling on it is safer. The installation of artificial turf was the first for any school in the Palm Beach County School District, according to Jim Cartmill, assistant director of program management with the School Board.

The stadium features a nine-lane track, bleachers that stretch from goal line to goal line (for the home team fans) and from 10-yard line to 10-yard line (for visitors), with seating for up to 4,025 people, a 1,000 seat increase over the previous stadium. The stadium is accessible to the handicapped. It also has a pole vault and high jump, along with eight lighted tennis courts. An Olympic-sized swimming pool was added and opened in early 2011.

Student body

Statistics 
Student-teacher ratio is 1:17
41% of teachers have advanced degrees
The average number of years teachers spend teaching is 2

Student ethnicity 
Student ethnicity is as follows:

 White 61%
 Hispanic 23%
 Black 11%
 Mixed race 3%
 Asian 3%
 Native American <1%
 European <1%

Student subgroups 
Statistics:

Students eligible for free or reduced-price lunch program 32%
Students with disabilities 11%
Gifted students 2%
English language learners 6%

Academics

FCAT scores 
2009 Passing Rate:

Grade 9
 Reading 70% (State Average: 49%)
 Math 85% (State Average: 68%)

Grade 10
 Reading 58% (State Average: 37%)
 Math 89% (State Average: 69%)
 Writing 89% (State Average: 77%)

Grade 11
 Science 53% (State Average: 37%)

AVID Program 
Boca High is initiating the use of AVID strategies, beginning 2017.

STEM Program 
Boca High is known for its magnet program, called STEM. This stands for Science, Technology, Engineering, and Math, and was started during the 2004–2005 school year.

Advanced placement 
In 2011–2012, the following Advanced Placement (AP) exams are available to students: 
Art History
Art: Studio 2-D Design
Art: Studio 3-D Design
Art: Studio Drawing
Biology
Calculus AB
Calculus BC
Capstone Seminar
Chemistry
Chinese Language & Culture
Economics: Macro
Economics: Micro
English Language & Composition
English Literature & Composition
Environmental Science
European History
French Language
Geography: Human
Government & Politics: U.S.
Government & Politics: Comparative
German Language
Music Theory
Physics A
Psychology
Spanish Language
Spanish Literature
Statistics
U.S. History
U.S. World History

Theater
The Boca Raton Community High School Theatre Department is home of the award-winning Thespian Troupe 2564 and a very active theater department and drama club which puts on numerous high-production musicals and plays in the 800-seat Kathryn Lindgren Theatre on campus. The Drama Club puts on an annual musical production each spring while the school offers thespian-related electives including theater, advanced theater, musical theater classes as well as dance. Thespian Troupe 2564 consistently wins superior ratings at district and state competitions while the Drama Club's spring musicals have won the Best Musical in South Florida at the Cappie Awards in 2016 and in 2018 for their productions of “Joseph and the Amazing Technicolor Dreamcoat” and “Sweet Charity”.

AICE Curriculum
Boca Raton High School offers AICE (Advanced International Certificate of Education) classes. AICE is run by Cambridge Assessment International Education. These courses are college accredited throughout universities in Florida, and depending on the level of completion of studies, are eligible for scholarships applicable within the state. The following AICE classes and standardized tests are offered at Boca Raton High School:

US History (History of the Americas)
International History
Sociology
Psychology
Thinking Skills
General Paper
Global Perspectives
English Language
Spanish Language
Business
Art and Design I
Art and Design II
Music I
Marine Science
Biology
Chemistry
General Math
Portuguese Language (initiated during the first quarter of the 2011–2012 school year)
Travel and Tourism

Athletics 

There has been a history of competitive rivalry with the neighboring high school, West Boca Raton High School, and Atlantic High School in football and baseball. In soccer and volleyball, however, the rivalry is with Spanish River High School.

Types of sports offered 
As of 2018:
Baseball: Junior Varsity, Varsity
Basketball: (Boys/Girls) - Freshman, Junior Varsity, Varsity
Bowling: (Boys/Girls)) - Varsity
Cheerleading: Junior Varsity, Varsity, Competition
Cross-Country - (Boys/Girls)
Dance: (Boys/Girls)
Football: Freshman, Junior Varsity, Varsity
Golf: (Boys/Girls)
Ice Hockey: Varsity
Intramural Flag Football
Lacrosse: (Boys/Girls)
Marching Band
Soccer: (Boys/Girls)- Junior Varsity, Varsity
Softball: Junior Varsity, Varsity
Swimming & Diving
Tennis
Track/Field
Water Polo: (Boys/Girls)
Weightlifting: (Boys/Girls) Varsity
Volleyball: (Boys/Girls)
Wrestling: Junior Varsity, Varsity

Achievements 

Swimming:
In 2007, after two years of near misses, the girls' team won the state championship. They went on to repeat the state title in 2008. The boys' team placed 37th in 2007, and followed with state runner-up in 2008; tied for the highest finish in school history. In 2012, the boys team places 1st overall at the state championships As of 2018, the swim team is coached by Allan Williams.

Football: 
•In 2019, the Varsity football team went 8-2 under the leadership of Brandon Walker.

Soccer:
In 2010, the boys' varsity soccer team finished first in Florida.
In 2009, the boys' varsity soccer team finished 2nd in the state championship.

Boys Lacrosse:
In 2009, the Varsity lacrosse team went 10–6 before losing to Spanish River 6–5 in the district semifinals. The Boys Lacrosse program is led by Calder Alfano.

Cross Country:
In 2008 the boys cross country team defeated St. Thomas Aquinas to capture its first district title in 13 years. The boys team is coached by John Combs.

DECA: 
•In 2019, the Boca High DECA team saw over 10 members make it to the International Career Development Conference, even having a member place 20th in the world.
•In 2020 the Boca High DECA team had a 53% placing rate at their district competition, much higher than rival school Spanish River's placement rate.

Marching Band:
 In 2010, the PRIDE of the Gold Coast Marching Band, directed by Laura Beard, won 2nd place in the FMBC State Finals.
 In 2012, the PRIDE of the Gold Coast Marching Band, directed by Jenn Mammino and Ben Sparrow, won 3rd place in the FMBC State Finals.
 In 2014, the PRIDE of the Gold Coast Marching Band, directed by Jenn Mammino and Ben Sparrow, placed in the top 5 in FMBC State Finals, and got 1st in percussion, in their class.

Robotics:
 In 2010, Boca High's FIRST LEGO League Team Mafia competed successfully, reaching the state Championship level. They also won "Master Champions" of the Palm Beach County competition.
 In 2011, Team 3622 "Robocats" competed in FIRST Robotics Competition, winning the "Rookie All Star Award" and earned a place at the FIRST Championship in St. Louis, MO.

Science Olympiad:
 The Boca High Science Olympiad team placed 1st in the state of Florida in 2011, 2012, 2013, 2014, 2015, 2016, 2017, and 2019.
 Their most recent placing at the National Tournament is 12th place during the 2016–2017 season.
 Notable Alumnus: include Noel Picinich (4-time national medalist), Kevin Hao (4-time national medalist), Taylor Knoll (3-time national medalist), Akaash Mohan (2-time national medalist), Montita Sowapark (2-time national medalist), Justin Greene (2-time national medalist), David Faris (2-time national medalist, Yuria Utsumi (2-time National medalist), and Elisa Carrillo (2-time national medalist).

Debate: 
 The Boca High Public Forum Debate Team of Patrick Poplawska and Alex Pollock was ranked 4th in the nation in January 2012. Additionally the team earned 5th place in the 2012 FFL State Championship.

Ice Hockey:
 In 2014, the Ice Hockey team, captained by Jonathan Garvin, won the D2 championships.
 In his Sophomore year, Andrew Bremer recorded 22 points in 15 games. He recorded 44 points in 44 games played.
 Bremer, along with Michael Lesh is very highly awarded by the Boca High Athletic Department.

Water Polo
 In 2014, the Men's Water Polo team captured their first District Championship in school history
 In 2017, the Men's Water Polo team captured their second District Championship in school history
 In 2019, the Men's Water Polo team captured their third District Championship in school history while also making their first State Championship Tournament in school history

Student Government Association (SGA) 

The Student Council of Boca Raton Community High School has a dominant presence at the Florida Association of Student Councils (FASC), and has been recognized accordingly. The leadership students have won more project awards in more categories than any other school in the state of Florida. For the 2011–2012 school year, Boca High's Ian Mellul was elected to serve as president of the FASC.The leadership students most recently accomplished the following at the 2010 FASC States Competition:

 Gold Medallion Council
 1st Place School Spirit
 1st Place Community Service
 1st Place Membership Motivation
 2nd Place Environmental Concerns
 2nd Place Citizenship Development
 3rd Place Faculty and Staff Relations

Boca Raton NJROTC 

The Bobcat Battalion was started in 1994 by LCDR Kenneth A. Bingham USN (Ret.) who was later joined by Chief Petty Officer Edwin A. Morales, USN (Ret.). The current Naval Science instructors are Lieutenant Colonel Dennis Powers USMC (Ret.), Master Chief Petty Officer Alberto C. Sosa USN (Ret.), and Chief Petty Officer Edwin A. Morales USN (Ret.). It has since become one of the best in the nation. The Regiment consisted of five companies, with approximately 400 cadets in the unit as of 2014.  Cadets' daily curriculum involves academics, physical training (PT), and general knowledge on life in the United States Navy. The NJROTC's main goal is to develop informed citizens. The current Commanding Officer of the unit is c/CDR Ellie Rafalski.

History:

1st Place 2016 Academic Team at Navy Nationals in Pensacola 
3rd Place 2016 Navy Nationals in Pensacola 
1st Place 2016 Florida State Championship 
1st place 2015 Navy Nationals in Pensacola
1st Place 2015 Florida State Championship 
2nd place 2014 Navy Nationals
1st place 2014 Florida State Championship
2nd place 2013 Navy Nationals
2nd place 2013 Florida State Championship	
2nd place 2012 Navy Nationals Championship
1st place 2012 Florida State Championship
1st place 2011 Navy Nationals in Pensacola	
1st place 2011 Florida State Championship	
3rd place 2010 Navy Nationals in Pensacola	
1st Place 2010 Florida State Championship 	
2nd Place 2009 Navy Nationals in Pensacola	
1st Place 2008 Academic Team at Navy Nationals in Pensacola 	
2nd Place 2008 Navy Nationals in Pensacola	
2nd Place 2007 Navy Nationals in Pensacola	
2nd Place 2007 Florida State Championship	
2nd Place 2006 Navy Nationals in Pensacola	
3rd Place 2006 Florida State Championship	
4th Place at 2005 Navy Nationals in Pensacola	
2nd Place, 2005 Florida State Championship	
6th Place at 2004 Navy Nationals in Pensacola	
1st Place at 2004 Florida State Championship	
3rd Place at 2003 Navy Nationals in Pensacola	
2002 Top NJROTC Unit in Area 7	
2nd Place at 2001 Navy Nationals in Pensacola	
3rd Place at 2000 Navy Nationals in Chicago	
3rd Place at 1999 Navy Nationals in Chicago	
2nd Place at 1998 Navy Nationals in San Diego		
5th Place at 1997 Navy Nationals in College Station, Texas

Notable alumni

Sports
 Greg Bellisari, former NFL player
 Steve Bellisari, former AFL player
 Yvenson Bernard, former CFL running back, played for the Saskatchewan Roughriders, and the Winnipeg Blue Bombers of the Canadian Football League
 Chi Chi Gonzalez, baseball pitcher; MLB Texas Rangers (20152016); currently pitching Minor League with the Colorado Rockies 
 Ernie Jones, former NFL player
 Sabby Piscitelli (born August 24, 1983), American professional wrestler and former American football safety
 Mark Richt, former American football head coach and player who previously held positions as the head football coach at the University of Georgia and University of Miami
Chris Stynes, former MLB player 1995–2004

Music
 Chris Carrabba, lead singer and guitarist of the band Dashboard Confessional, lead singer of the band Further Seems Forever, and the vocalist for the folk band Twin Forks.

Movies
 Noah Centineo attended 9th and 10th grade at Boca Raton High School before moving to Los Angeles to pursue acting. He has been in Austin & Ally, The Fosters, and the Netflix romantic comedy, To All the Boys I’ve Loved Before.

Hedge Fund Managers

 Kenneth C. Griffin attended, was the president of his math club.

See also
 Education in the United States
 List of school districts in Florida

References

External links 
Boca Raton Community High School
Official Bobcats Football
JROTC
School District of Palm Beach County
National Federation of American Students Chapter at Boca Raton
Boca Raton Community High School Band
Boca Raton High School Drama Department

High schools in Palm Beach County, Florida
Educational institutions established in 1963
Public high schools in Florida
1963 establishments in Florida